Vision Crew Unlimited (VCU) was a motion picture and TV commercial visual effects company founded in 1994 by visual effects artists Evan Jacobs, Jon Warren and Douglas Miller. The company later expanded into a full service visual effects firm.

In 1996, VCU contributed miniature effects to James Cameron's film Titanic.  While they were initially hired as a subcontractor to lead effects house Digital Domain, VCU was ultimately hired directly by 20th Century Fox to build miniatures for the engine room sequence as well. In an interesting coincidence later that same year, the company was contracted to work on a CBS TV miniseries with the same name.

While the company worked on many feature films, they were much more prolific in the television commercial market, and worked on over forty spots in eight years. Their work was featured in ads for the majority of car brands as well as Coca-Cola, Pizza Hut, and Geico.

In 1998, Jacobs and John Hoffman were nominated for an Emmy Award for Outstanding Special Visual Effects for a Miniseries representing VCU's work on HBO's "From the Earth to the Moon".

Vision Crew closed in April 2002. The company attributed its shutdown to a difficult business climate and the founders' interest in pursuing other projects and opportunities.

Credits

Feature films 
 The Mummy
 Dinosaur
 Jack Frost
 Armageddon
 Species II
 Mortal Kombat: Annihilation
 Flubber
 Dante's Peak
 The Fifth Element
 Titanic
 The Arrival
 Kazaam
 Space Jam
 Sometimes They Come Back...Again

Episodic and long-form television 
 Monday Night Football graphics
 Star Trek: Voyager episode "The Killing Game"
 From The Earth To The Moon
 The Outer Limits "To Tell the Truth"
 Tower of Terror
 Tempting Fate
 A Wing and a Prayer
 Titanic (miniseries)

Television commercials

References

External links 
 

Special effects companies
Visual effects companies
Computer animation
Privately held companies based in California
American companies established in 1994
American companies disestablished in 2002